Garmuk may refer to:
 Garmuk, Isfahan